Anthology is a 2003 compilation album by the Canadian rock band The Guess Who. Anthology is a career-spanning collection of songs recorded between 1964 and 1975. The songs are arranged in chronological order.

This compilation was re-released as The Essential Guess Who as a part of The Essential series in 2010. 

CD 1 contains a hidden track of an RCA radio spot for Wheatfield Soul.  CD 2 contains two hidden tracks, promos for Road Food and Flavours.

Reception

Steve Leggett of AllMusic: 
"This two-disc, 39-track set collects all of those singles, from the group’s fiery 1964 cover of “Shakin’ All Over” (sung by Chad Allen -- Cummings hadn’t yet joined the band) through 1974’s willfully nostalgic “Clap for the Wolfman,” which was to be the Guess Who's last big radio hit -- they disbanded a year later in 1975. In between they released classics like the gorgeous ballad “These Eyes,” the Zombies-like “Undun,” the fuzz guitar-laced “No Time,” a subtly veiled critique of American capitalism, “American Woman,” the marvelous pop songs “Hand Me Down World” and “Bus Rider,” the stomping “Heartbroken Bopper,” and the driving, slightly sarcastic “Star Baby,” and each of these is collected here, among other interesting tracks."

Track listing

Production
Mastered by Vic Anesini at Sony Music Studios, NYC
Compilation Producer – Al Quaglieri

References

2003 compilation albums
The Guess Who albums
Bertelsmann Music Group compilation albums